Lim Jose-ning (born June 1934) is a Taiwanese weightlifter. He competed in the men's featherweight event at the 1956 Summer Olympics.

References

External links
 

1934 births
Living people
Taiwanese male weightlifters
Olympic weightlifters of Taiwan
Weightlifters at the 1956 Summer Olympics
Place of birth missing (living people)